Diablo Grande is a census-designated place (CDP) in Stanislaus County, California. It is a gated bedroom community nestled in the Diablo Range, whence it gets its name. The 2010 United States census reported Diablo Grande's population was 826. The 2018 estimated population was 1,200.

Background
A gated community and golf resort developed by Don Panoz, in May 1990, the Patterson city council received preliminary plans for Diablo Grande. The project was later approved in the fall of 1993. By 1999, the Stanislaus County superior court had rejected Diablo Grande's second environmental impact report with the argument that it had failed to properly protect the surrounding environment and there was no answer to where water would come from due to the area not containing adequate on-site water. In response to these claims, Diablo Grande created the Western Hills Water District to serve the community. Water transfers from former agriculture land to the community were arranged and 12,000 acres have been preserved for wildlife.

Developer Donald Panoz envisioned Diablo Grande to consist of 5,000 to 10,000 homes, a resort hotel and spa, six golf courses, an equestrian center, vineyards, a winery and commercial properties, including a high-tech research park. After investing $120 million into Diablo Grande and the financial crisis of 2007–08 occurring, the investors of the community filed for chapter 11 bankruptcy on March 10, 2008. There were more than $54 million in unpaid debts and 70 out of the 350 homes built faced foreclosure.

In October 2008, World International LLC purchased Diablo Grande for $20 million. The California Department of Health temporarily suspended new building permits in January 2009 when water tests showed Trihalomethane levels at 0.103 milligrams per liter vs. the state standard of 0.080 milligrams per liter.

Diablo Grande's Legends golf course, designed by Jack Nicklaus and Gene Sarazen, was closed in March 2014 due to the drought in California.

In May 2017, the Stanislaus County Board of Supervisors approved a revised plan for the community. An additional 1,000 single-family homes could be built by reducing the number of condos and townhouses and eliminating apartments. Also, instead of building homes spread along the hillsides, residential areas will be grouped together, leaving more open terrain and walking trails. The revised plan brings the total number of housing units to 2,354.

By the fall of 2019, it was announced that the remaining golf course at Diablo Grande would close in October. It was also revealed that World International has outstanding tax bills on about half of its 340 parcels at Diablo Grande, totaling more than $6 million, and is looking for a new owner.

On May 7, 2020, World International, LLC sold substantially all of its property within the Phase 1 development area of the District to Angel’s Crossing, LLC.

On August 19, 2020 at 3:00 PM Pacific Time, due to the SCU Lightning Complex fires of 2020, the California Department of Forestry and Fire Prevention issued an evacuation order of Diablo Grande. The evacuation order was lifted on August 20, 2020 at 2:00 PM.

Geography
According to the United States Census Bureau, the CDP covers an area of 5.1 square miles (13.2 km2), 99.99% of it land and 0.01% of it water.

Demographics

The 2010 United States Census reported that Diablo Grande had a population of 826. The racial makeup of Diablo Grande was 510 (61.7%) White, 77 (9.3%) African American, 3 (0.4%) Native American, 70 (8.5%) Asian, 6 (0.7%) Pacific Islander, 77 (9.3%) from other races, and 83 (10.0%) from two or more races. Hispanic or Latino of any race were 254 persons (30.8%).

The census reported that 826 people (100% of the population) lived in households, 0 (0%) lived in non-institutionalized group quarters, and 0 (0%) were institutionalized.

There were 307 households, out of which 107 (34.9%) had children under the age of 18 living in them, 192 (62.5%) were opposite-sex married couples living together, 25 (8.1%) had a female householder with no husband present, 14 (4.6%) had a male householder with no wife present.  There were 18 (5.9%) unmarried opposite-sex partnerships, and 6 (2.0%) same-sex married couples or partnerships. 54 households (17.6%) were made up of individuals, and 5 (1.6%) had someone living alone who was 65 years of age or older. The average household size was 2.69.  There were 231 families (75.2% of all households); the average family size was 3.09.

The population was spread out, with 217 people (26.3%) under the age of 18, 47 people (5.7%) aged 18 to 24, 249 people (30.1%) aged 25 to 44, 249 people (30.1%) aged 45 to 64, and 64 people (7.7%) who were 65 years of age or older.  The median age was 37.9 years. For every 100 females, there were 110.7 males.  For every 100 females age 18 and over, there were 107.1 males.

The homeowner vacancy rate was 10.6%; the rental vacancy rate was 16.0%.  615 people (74.5% of the population) lived in owner-occupied housing units and 211 people (25.5%) lived in rental housing units.

References

Census-designated places in Stanislaus County, California
Census-designated places in California
Diablo Range